George Francis Sheridan (30 October 1929 – 21 December 1986) was an English professional footballer who played as an outside right.

Career
Born in Wigan, Sheridan spent his early career with Bolton Wanderers and Colwyn Bay. He signed for Bradford City in January 1952, making 12 league appearances for the club, before being released later in 1952.

Sources

References

1929 births
1986 deaths
English footballers
Bolton Wanderers F.C. players
Colwyn Bay F.C. players
Bradford City A.F.C. players
English Football League players
Association football outside forwards